Peter Muller, Peter Müller or Peter Mueller may refer to:

 Peter Müller (ice hockey) (1896–1974), Swiss ice hockey player
 Peter Muller (architect) (1927–2023), architect with works in Bali, Sydney, South Australia and Melbourne
 Peter Müller (boxer) (1928–2013), Swiss boxer
 Peter Müller (footballer, born 1946), East German footballer
 Peter Müller (footballer, born 1948), West German footballer
 Peter Muller (Canadian football) (born 1951), former tight end for the Toronto Argonauts
 Peter Mueller (speed skater) (born 1954), former US speed skater and speed skating coach
 Peter Müller (politician) (born 1955), German politician and judge
 Peter Müller (skier) (born 1957), Swiss alpine skier competing in the 1980s
 Peter Müller (co-driver) (born 1962), Austrian rally co-driver
 Peter Müller (footballer, born 1969), German footballer
 Pete Muller (photographer) (born 1982), news photographer
 Peter Mueller (ice hockey) (born 1988), American ice hockey player, playing in the NLA
 Peter Muller (actor), played Dr. Logan King in the television series Shortland Street
 Pete Muller (businessman and singer-songwriter), musician and founder and CEO of PDT Partners

See also 

 Johannes Peter Müller (1801–1858), German physiologist
 Peter Erasmus Müller (1776–1834), Danish bishop
 Peter Millar (disambiguation)
 Peter Miller (disambiguation)
 Peter Møller (born 1972), Danish football (soccer) player
 Pierre Muller (born 1952), member of the government of Geneva, Switzerland